Dwayne Morgan is a Canadian spoken word artist, motivational speaker and event organizer based in Toronto, Ontario.

Morgan began his career as a spoken word artist in 1993
. He is the founder of Up From The Roots Entertainment, which was established in 1994 to promote the positive artistic contributions of African Canadian and urban influenced artists. He received both the African Canadian Achievement Award for Youth Achievement, and the Harry Jerome Award for Excellence in the Arts in 1998. Morgan has self-published two chapbooks and three full volumes of his poetry.

As a producer, Morgan has now produced over 100 events, the largest of which are the annual spoken word concerts When Brothers Speak and When Sisters Speak, and the Toronto International Poetry Slam on Labour Day weekend each year.

Morgan collaborated with Driftwood Studios to film Three Knocks, a ten-minute film based on his domestic violence poem of the same name, which premiered at the 2006 Reel World Film Festival in Toronto.

He was a member of the 2007 Toronto Slam Team formed by Up From The Roots. The team finished second at the 2007 Canadian Festival of Spoken Word in Halifax, Nova Scotia.

Morgan was the host of Diasporic Music, a monthly spoken word show on CKLN-FM, and is an advice columnist in the free daily paper, 24 Hours, in Toronto. He is also a Toronto regional representative on the board of directors for Spoken Word Canada, and is an active member of the Spoken Word Arts Network (SWAN).

Morgan was nominated as the candidate of the New Democratic Party in Scarborough North for the 2018 Ontario general election. He placed second, to the incumbent Progressive Conservative candidate, Raymond Cho.

Electoral history

Bibliography

Poetry books
Long Overdue - one of the most popular that includes must read poems.
The Man Behind the Mic
The Making of A Man

Chapbooks
Straight From The Roots
The Revolution Starts Within

Awards
African Canadian Achievement Award for Youth Achievement, 1998
Harry Jerome Award for Excellence in the Arts, 1998
The Evolution, Canadian Urban Music Award for Best Spoken Word Recording, 2001
Soul Searching, Canadian Urban Music Award for Best Spoken Word Recording, 2003
"Mother I Understand" from A Decade in the Making, Canadian Urban Music Award for Best Spoken Word Recording, 2005

See also

Slam poetry

References

External links 

Black Canadian musicians
20th-century Canadian poets
Canadian male poets
Canadian spoken word poets
Living people
Musicians from Toronto
Writers from Toronto
Slam poets
21st-century Canadian poets
Black Canadian writers
20th-century Canadian male writers
1974 births
21st-century Canadian male writers
Ontario New Democratic Party candidates in Ontario provincial elections